Ayoub El Harrak (born 28 January 1999) is a Belgian professional footballer who plays as a midfielder for the Belgian club URSL Visé.

Professional career
El Harrak made his professional debut with K.A.S. Eupen in a Belgian First Division A 3–1 loss to Beerschot on 19 May 2018. On 13 June 2019, El Harrak signed his first professional contract with Eupen.

In August 2020, it was announced that El Harrak signed a three-year contract with URSL Visé.

References

External links
 

1999 births
Living people
People from Fléron
Belgian footballers
Belgian sportspeople of Moroccan descent
Association football midfielders
K.A.S. Eupen players
Belgian Pro League players
Belgian Third Division players
Footballers from Liège Province